Cedric Price FRIBA (11 September 1934 – 10 August 2003) was an English architect and influential teacher and writer on architecture.

Early life and education 
The son of an architect (A.G. Price, who worked with Harry Weedon), Price was born in Stone, Staffordshire and studied architecture at Cambridge University (St John's College – graduating in 1955) and the Architectural Association School of Architecture in London, where he encountered, and was influenced by, the modernist architect and urban planner Arthur Korn. From 1958 to 1964 he taught part-time at the Architectural Association School of Architecture and at the Council of Industrial Design. He later founded Polyark, an architectural schools network.

Career 
After graduating, Price worked briefly for Erno Goldfinger, Denys Lasdun, the partnership of Maxwell Fry and Jane Drew, and applied unsuccessfully for a post at London County Council, working briefly as a professional illustrator before starting his own practice in 1960. He worked with The Earl of Snowdon and Frank Newby on the design of the Snowdon Aviary at London Zoo (1961). He later also worked with Buckminster Fuller on the Claverton Dome.

One of his more notable projects was the East London Fun Palace (1961), developed in association with theatrical director Joan Littlewood and cybernetician Gordon Pask. Although it was never built, its flexible space influenced other architects, notably Richard Rogers and Renzo Piano whose Centre Georges Pompidou in Paris extended many of Price's ideas – some of which Price used on a more modest scale in the Inter-Action Centre at Kentish Town, London (1971).

Having conceived the idea of using architecture and education as a way to drive economic redevelopment – notably in the north Staffordshire Potteries area (the 'Thinkbelt' project) – he continued to contribute to planning debates. Think-Belt (1963–66) envisaged the reuse of an abandoned railway line as a roving "higher education facility", re-establishing the Potteries as a centre of science and technology. Mobile classroom, laboratory and residential modules could be moved grouped and assembled as required.

In 1969, with planner Sir Peter Hall and the editor of New Society magazine Paul Barker, he published Non-plan, a work challenging planning orthodoxy.

In 1984 Price proposed the redevelopment of London's South Bank, and foresaw the London Eye by suggesting that a giant Ferris wheel should be constructed by the River Thames.

Personal life and death 
Price was the partner of the actress Eleanor Bron. They had no children.

Price died in London, aged 68, in 2003.

References
Notes

Further reading
 Hardingham, Samantha (2016) Cedric Price Works 1952–2003: A Forward-Minded Retrospective  a two-volume anthology, co-published by the Architectural Association (AA) and the Canadian Centre for Architecture (CCA)
 Bron, Eleanor and Hardingham, Samantha, eds. (2005)  Annotations: v. 7: CP Retriever, Institute of International Visual Arts (INIVA), London 
 Hardingham, Samantha (2003) Cedric Price: Opera, London: John Wiley & Sons, London.
 Hardingham, Samantha and Rattenbury, Kester, eds. (2007) Cedric Price: Potteries Thinkbelt. London: Routledge. 
 Hughes, Jonathan and Sadler, Simon, eds. (2000) Non-Plan: Essays on Freedom, Participation and Change in Modern Architecture and Urbanism. Oxford: Architectural Press.  
 Muschamp, Herbert (15 August 2003) "Cedric Price, Influential British Architect With Sense of Fun, Dies at 68" (obituary) The New York Times
 Price, Cedric (1984) Cedric Price: Works II, Architectural Association; republished in 2003 as Cedric Price: The Square Book. London: Wiley-Academy, London.
 Staff (ndg) "Cedric Price" Design Museum
 Staff (22 August 2003) "Cedric Price, A leading light of the 'megastructure' movement whose work was guided by amusing and inspirational ideas" (obituary). The Times

External links
 Finding aid for the Cedric Price fonds at the Canadian Centre for Architecture (digitized items)

People from Stone, Staffordshire
1934 births
2003 deaths
20th-century English architects
Alumni of St John's College, Cambridge
Alumni of the Architectural Association School of Architecture
Fellows of the Royal Institute of British Architects
Architects from Staffordshire